Joe Tippmann (born March 24, 2001) is an American football center for the Wisconsin Badgers.

References

External links

Wisconsin Badgers bio

2001 births
Living people
American football centers
American football offensive guards
Players of American football from Fort Wayne, Indiana
Wisconsin Badgers football players